Beulah Russell, christened Beatrice Beulah Russell and also known as Bulah Russell, (October 22, 1878 – February 22, 1940) was an American mathematician.

Education
Beulah graduated from Randolph–Macon Woman's College with a Bachelor of Arts in 1903, and graduated from the University of Chicago with a Master of Arts in 1919.

Career
From 1903 to 1905 Beulah taught at Lafayette College as an instructor in mathematics. From 1905 to 1909 she taught at Grenada College as a professor of mathematics. From 1909 to 1925 she taught at Randolph–Macon Woman's College as an instructor of mathematics and an adjunct professor of mathematics. In 1925 she became an associate professor of mathematics at the College of William & Mary.

In a 1923 edition of The American Mathematical Monthly it is recorded that Beulah was elected to membership in the Mathematical Association of America.

In 1930 Beulah became the first female professor to attend the Edinburgh Mathematical Society Colloquium held in St Andrews, Scotland.

External links
 Beulah Russell, "Relation between the definite integral and summation of series", 1919 (University of Chicago Master of Arts Dissertation)
 Carolyn Lamb Sparks Whittenburg, "President J.A.C. Chandler and the first women faculty at the College of William and Mary", D.Ed. Thesis (College of William & Mary, May 2004).

Further reading
"Beulah Russell Death Mourned By College", The Flat Hat. College of William & Mary. (27 February 1940).

References

1878 births
1940 deaths
American mathematicians
American women mathematicians
Randolph College alumni
University of Chicago alumni
Women mathematicians